The following highways are numbered 157:

Canada
 Prince Edward Island Route 157 (DeBlois Road)
 Quebec Route 157

Costa Rica
 National Route 157

Japan
 Japan National Route 157

United States
 Alabama State Route 157
 Arkansas Highway 157
 California State Route 157 (former)
 Colorado State Highway 157
 Connecticut Route 157
 Florida State Road 157
 Georgia State Route 157
 Illinois Route 157
 Indiana State Road 157
 K-157 (Kansas highway)
 Kentucky Route 157
 Louisiana Highway 157
 Maine State Route 157
 Maryland Route 157
 M-157 (Michigan highway)
 Missouri Route 157
 Nevada State Route 157
 New Jersey Route 157
 New Mexico State Road 157
 New York State Route 157
 New York State Route 157A
 North Carolina Highway 157
 Pennsylvania Route 157
 South Carolina Highway 157
 Tennessee State Route 157
 Texas State Highway 157 (former)
 Texas State Highway Loop 157
 Utah State Route 157
 Virginia State Route 157
 Wisconsin Highway 157
 Wyoming Highway 157
Territories
 Puerto Rico Highway 157